Medford Bryan Evans (August 21, 1907 – February 4, 1989) was a college professor, writer, editor, and critic of liberalism in American politics, education, and society. He was the father of the columnist M. Stanton Evans.

Background
Evans was born in Lufkin in Angelina County in East Texas, the son of Lysander Lee Evans and the former Bird Medford. He graduated magna cum laude in 1927 from the University of Tennessee at Chattanooga and in 1933 received a Ph.D. from Yale University in New Haven, Connecticut. He taught at the University of Mississippi at Oxford, Mississippi (1928–1933), the Texas College of Arts and Industries—now known as Texas A&M University–Kingsville—(1933–1934), the University of Tennessee at Chattanooga (1934–1942), the University of the South in Sewanee, Tennessee (1943–1944), McMurry College in Abilene (as dean), Texas — now known as McMurry University— (1953–1954) and Northwestern State College in Natchitoches, Louisiana,—now Northwestern State University—in 1955-1959.

In addition, Evans worked for the since defunct radio station WDOD (AM) in Chattanooga, Tennessee (1943–1944), the Atomic Energy Commission in Oak Ridge, Tennessee and Washington, D.C. (1944–1952), the Los Alamos project, the publication Facts Forum for H.L. Hunt and Dan Smoot (1954–1955), and the Jackson (Mississippi) Citizen's Council as managing editor of The Citizen: A Journal of Fact and Opinion (1962-?), official publication of the Citizens' Councils of America in Jackson. One of Evans' articles in The Citizen, "How to Start a Private School" (1964), was republished as a small book and became influential in the South's burgeoning movement toward private day-schools to avoid school desegregation. (These schools were sometimes labeled "segregation academies" or "Christian academies" in the press, but virtually all now admit African-American pupils.)

Evans was also a member of the John Birch Society, founded by Robert W. Welch, Jr. During the 1960s and 1970s, he was a frequent contributor to the JBS monthly magazine, American Opinion. Evans also published articles in the conservative magazines National Review and Human Events.

Evans' other published writings include the books The Secret War for the A-Bomb (1953), Civil Rights Myths and Communist Realities (1965), The Usurpers (1968), and The Assassination of Joe McCarthy (1970), reflecting his belief in the revelations of communist subversion unveiled in the 1950s by U.S. Senator Joseph R. McCarthy of Wisconsin. The book The Death of James Forrestal (1966) by "Cornell Simpson" has also been attributed to Evans, an attribution challenged by his son, M. Stanton Evans.

Evans also lectured widely, even in small towns, mostly on anti-communist topics. Speaking in Minden, Louisiana, in 1956, Evans likened the attack on segregation in the South to communism.

Educational philosophy 

Evans contributed articles on educational trends to magazines (e.g. Harper's) and newspapers. His usual topics were the decline in classical education, the need for vocational education, and the use of public schools to promote social engineering. A typical paragraph, from "What Are We Teaching Our Children" in American Opinion, shows how he could touch on all three themes at once:

Later years

Evans and his wife, the former Josephine Stanton (1908-2005), a teacher and government worker who was reared in McComb, Mississippi and graduated with honors from the University of Mississippi. The couple had a son, columnist M. Stanton Evans. The Evanses moved in 1986 from Jackson, Mississippi, to Hamilton in Loudoun County, Virginia, where each subsequently died.

Selected works
 Civil Rights Myths and Communist Realities. Conservative Society of America, 1965. .

References

1907 births
1989 deaths
People from Lufkin, Texas
20th-century American educators
American radio personalities
Texas A&M University–Kingsville faculty
Citizens' Councils
Northwestern State University faculty
Yale University alumni
University of Tennessee at Chattanooga alumni
People from Natchitoches, Louisiana
Writers from Jackson, Mississippi
People from Chattanooga, Tennessee
People from Loudoun County, Virginia
John Birch Society members
20th-century American non-fiction writers
American anti-communists
Old Right (United States)